Dromaeschna is a genus of dragonflies in the family Telephlebiidae.
Species of Dromaeschna are large dragonflies endemic to north-eastern Australia.

Species
The genus Dromaeschna includes the following 2 species:

Dromaeschna forcipata  – green-striped darner
Dromaeschna weiskei  – ochre-tipped darner

See also
 List of Odonata species of Australia

References

Telephlebiidae
Anisoptera genera
Odonata of Australia
Endemic fauna of Australia
Taxa named by Friedrich Förster
Insects described in 1908